Salvia marashica is a rare perennial plant that is endemic to Ahır Mountain, near Kahramanmaraş in Turkey. It grows on rocky mountain slopes at  elevation.

The inflorescence is unusual for Salvia species, being covered in black-headed glandular hairs. The specific epithet comes from the name of the city, "Kahramanmaras", where the type specimen was collected.

References

External links 

marashica
Flora of Turkey
Plants described in 2009
Garden plants of Asia